Pernilla Lindberg (born 7 May 1994) is a Swedish Paralympic swimmer who competes mainly in freestyle swimming events in international level events.  She competed at the 2016 Summer Paralympics, and 2020 Summer Paralympics.

She competed at the 2019 INAS Global Games.

References

External links 

 Pernilla Lindberg, Swimming Women's 100m backstroke final Parasport Sverige, September 8, 2016

1994 births
Living people
Swimmers from Gothenburg
Paralympic swimmers of Sweden
Swedish female freestyle swimmers
Swimmers at the 2012 Summer Paralympics
Swimmers at the 2016 Summer Paralympics
Medalists at the World Para Swimming Championships
S14-classified Paralympic swimmers
Swimmers at the 2020 Summer Paralympics
20th-century Swedish women
21st-century Swedish women